Miguel Ángel Martín may refer to:

Miguel Ángel Martín (basketball), for Real Madrid Baloncesto
Miguel Ángel Martín (comics), Spanish comic author and artist
Miguel Ángel Martín (golfer), Spanish golfer
Miguel Ángel Martín Perdiguero, Spanish road cyclist